Fushiebridge railway station served the area of Fushiebridge, Gorebridge, from 1847 to 1959 on the Waverley Route.

History 
The station opened on 12 July 1847, by the North British Railway. The station was situated to the north of an unnamed minor road. There was a goods yard to the south of the station and two private sidings, one to the west over a river and one to two of the Vogrie group of collieries with a steep loco-worked incline. The colliery was near Esperston Lime Quarry, as well as a newer signal box and the northern sidings. The station closed in 1943 to passengers but was used for railway staff until 1959.

Rail accident 
A fatal accident happened on 10 January 1937 when a shunter driver, William Patrick Egan, was killed during a shunter operation. He was stuck between the engine and the wagon buffers. He was only 36 years old when he died.

References

External links 

Disused railway stations in Midlothian
Railway stations in Great Britain opened in 1847
Railway stations in Great Britain closed in 1943
Former North British Railway stations